Frederick Joseph Otnes Jr. (December 3, 1925 – July 28, 2015) was an American illustrator. A resident of Redding, Connecticut, he was best known for his collage paintings. He was born in Junction City, Kansas and died in Westport, Connecticut.

Articles
Art in America (review, Jonathan Goodman) December 2002
Artnews (review, Arlene McKanic) September 2002
ARTnews (review, Mary Schneider Enriquez) December 2000
ARTFORUM International, May 1999, pp. 180–181
Print magazine, 1975 March–April
Northlight, 1976 March–April
Graphis, No. 188, 1976–77
Communication Arts, Vol. 15, No. 3, 1973
Idea magazine, No. 172, 1982
Illustration in the Third Dimension-Hastings House
Today's Art, Vol. 28, No. 5
Typographic, Vol. 12, No. 2
Who's Who in Graphic Art, De Clivo Press
Step by Step magazine, Vol 5, No. 4, 1988
World Graphic Design, Japan, 1991
Styling magazine, Japan, 1991
Creation magazine, 1991
The Greatest Illustration Show of America, Japan, 1992
Confetti magazine, May 1993
Novum Gebrauchsgraphik, Germany, 1993
Idea magazine, Japan, 1993
Grafica magazine, Brazil, 1994
Artnews magazine, February 1994
Design magazine, Korea, 1995

References

External links
ZAKS
Biography

1925 births
2015 deaths
American illustrators
People from Redding, Connecticut